Prosadpur (official name " Prasadpur ") is a village in Haripal (community development block) in Chandannagore subdivision of Hooghly district in West Bengal, India.

Location 
It is situated between Jagatballavpur and Jangipara.

Transport 
Prasadpur is 2.5 km apart from Ahilyabai Holkar Road (State Highway 15).
Roads of the village are mainly made with red mud.

Bus

Private Bus
 9A Haripal railway station - Bargachia

Bus Route Without Number
 Rajbalhat - Howrah Station
 Tarakeswar - Bargachia

Train 
Nearest railway station is Bargachia railway station on Howrah-Amta line. It is nearly 10 km away from Prasadpur.

Demographics 

According to 2011 Census of India total population was 1019, where male population was 488 (47.89%) and female population was 531 (52.11%) among them 652 (63.89%) were literate (Male:315, Female:337). 137 were in age group 0-6 yrs.

Education 
A Primary School is situated nearly middle of the village which is established in 1969. There is no high school there.

Cultural and religious views 
People of Prosadpur practices mainly Islam and Hinduism. There is a Mosque , an Eidgah and two Temple in here. Prasadpur is famous for Baba Panchananda Temple. (বাবা পঞ্চানন্দ মন্দির)।

Main festivals is Eid and Durga Puja.

Males are mainly wear Panjabi, pajamas, Shirt , Dhuti, Lungi and Trousers  and females are wear Sari, Churidar and Shalwar kameez.

Economy 
Agriculture is the main economic backbone. Irrigation system are moderate. A DVC Canal is present which carries water for agriculture from rever Damodar. Groundwater also is used in irrigation purpose.

Produced crop 
Rice
Potato
Jute
Mustard
Sesame

Produced vegetable
Rubbed Gourd
Long Bean
Drumstick
Palwal or Potol
Brinjal
Tomato
Chicinga or Hopa
Spinach
Cabbage
Cucumber
Cauliflower
onion
Okra

No small or big industries are here.

Gallery

References 

Villages in Hooghly district